The Expedition of Dahhak al-Kilabi, against the Banu Kilab tribe, took place in August 630 AD, 9AH, 2nd month, of the Islamic Calendar. When the Muslims arrived, brief fighting took place, and the Banu Kilab fled. Al-Asyad then captured his father, and held him until he could get support from another Muslim, who then killed his father.

Expedition
Muhammad sent al-Dahak ibn Sufyan to al-Zuji to invite the people of Banu Kilab to call them to embrace Islam. They refused to embrace Islam and fighting took place, they started to fight against the Muslims, but were defeated.

Among the fighters on the Muslim side, was a man named al-Asyad. He met his father named Salamah and called him to embrace Islam. However his father verbally abused Islam. Then al-Asyad hamstrung his fathers horse. When he fell to the ground, he grabbed hold of him, until he could get support from another Muslim, who then killed his father. All the other tribesmen of the Banu Kilab fled the scene after brief fighting.

Islamic primary sources

The event is also mentioned by the Muslim Scholar Ibn Sa'd in his book "Kitab al-tabaqat al-kabir", as follows:

See also
Military career of Muhammad
List of expeditions of Muhammad

References

630
Campaigns ordered by Muhammad
Banu Kilab